is a German Autobahn that begins at the Dutch-German border near Goch and ends in Köln. It runs parallel to the Rhine River. Neuss and Krefeld are the biggest cities at this motorway. The A 57 is continuation of the Dutch A77. Because of its high economic importance, its nickname is "Trans-Niederrhein-Magistrale". Most of it is two lanes each way only and prone to traffic jams in the rush hour. Currently the sections junction 15 - 18, 19 - 24 and 29 - 30 have three lanes each way. The section from junction 28 to 29 southbound has the possibility to open the hard shoulder as a third lane in heavy traffic. Traffic jams are possible between junctions 10 and 15, 17 and 20 as well as around junctions 27/28. There is a variable speed limit between junction 10 and 23. The sections from junction 23 to 24 and 27 to 30 have a limit of 100 km/h. Between junctions 27 and 28 the limit was reduced to 80 km/h between 10pm and 6am at night.

Exit list

|colspan="2"|
|From interchange Rijkevoort  (NL)
|-
|colspan="2" style="text-align:center;"| 
|Netherlands
|-
|colspan="3"|

 

 
 

 

 

 

|}

External links 
 

57
A057

 End Germania Inizio Italia I ITALIA Inizio A7 Genova-Milano